is a railway station in Inage-ku, Chiba, Japan, operated by the Keisei Electric Railway.

Lines

Station layout
Midoridai Station has two opposed side platforms connected by an overpass.

Platforms

History

After World War II, university dropped the name “Imperial”, and the station was renamed  accordingly. It assumed its present name on 1 October 1971.

Station numbering was introduced to all Keisei Line stations on 17 July 2010; Midoridai Station was assigned station number KS56.

External links

 Keisei Station layout

References

Railway stations in Japan opened in 1923
Railway stations in Chiba Prefecture